MetaMask is a software cryptocurrency wallet used to interact with the Ethereum blockchain. It allows users to access their Ethereum wallet through a browser extension or mobile app, which can then be used to interact with decentralized applications. MetaMask is developed by ConsenSys Software Inc., a blockchain software company focusing on Ethereum-based tools and infrastructure.

Overview
MetaMask allows users to store and manage account keys, broadcast transactions, send and receive Ethereum-based cryptocurrencies and tokens, and securely connect to decentralized applications through a compatible web browser or the mobile app's built-in browser.  

Websites or other decentralized applications are able to connect, authenticate, and/or integrate other smart contract functionality with a user's MetaMask wallet (and any other similar blockchain wallet browser extensions) via JavaScript code that allows the website to send action prompts, signature requests, or transaction requests to the user through MetaMask as an intermediary.  

The application includes an integrated service for exchanging Ethereum tokens by aggregating several decentralized exchanges (DEXs) to find the best exchange rate. This feature, branded as MetaMask Swaps, charges a service fee of 0.875% of the transaction amount.

, MetaMask's browser extension had over 21 million monthly active users, according to Bloomberg.

History 
MetaMask was created by ConsenSys in 2016.

Prior to 2019, MetaMask had only been available as a desktop browser extension for Google Chrome and Firefox browsers. Given the popularity of MetaMask among cryptocurrency users, and its lack of an official mobile app for several years, instances of malicious software posing as MetaMask became problematic for Google in regulating its Chrome Web Store and Google Play platforms. In one instance, Google Play unintentionally removed MetaMask's official beta app before reverting the decision a week later on January 1, 2020.

Starting in 2019, MetaMask began releasing mobile app versions for closed beta testing, followed by their official public release for iOS and Android in September 2020.

During October 2020, MetaMask Swaps, a built-in DEX aggregation service was added to the desktop extension. The product became available on mobile devices in March 2021.

Criticism 
While MetaMask and other "web3" focused applications aim to decentralize control over personal data and increase user privacy, critics have pointed to the potential for MetaMask's browser extension to leak identifiable information to data collection networks and web trackers as a fundamental flaw.

References 

Ethereum
Mobile applications
Blockchain entities
2016 software
Cryptocurrency projects